Al Salam Stadium, also referred to as Al Ahly WE Al Salam Stadium for sponsorship reasons following their acquisition of the stadium, is a multi-use stadium used mostly for association football matches with an all-seated capacity of 30,000. The stadium is the home venue of Egyptian Premier League sides Al Ahly and El Entag El Harby. The stadium was built in 2009 and hosted Group B during the 2009 FIFA U-20 World Cup, and also hosted matches in the 2019 Africa Cup of Nations.

Takeover by Al Ahly

On 4 December 2019, Al Ahly announced that they acquired the stadium from the Egyptian Ministry of Military Production for 25 years until 2045 as part of the club's "2045 vision", with an option to return the stadium if Al Ahly's new proposed stadium is built. As a result, it was reported that the stadium's official name was officially changed from Al Salam Stadium to Al Ahly WE Al Salam Stadium on 12 August 2020. However, El Entag El Harby president Ashraf Amer announced only one day later that stadium's name will not change from Al Salam Stadium according to the agreement reached between Al Ahly, the Egyptian Ministry of Military Production, and Estadat.

Despite acquiring the stadium, Al Ahly confirmed that El Entag El Harby, a club owned by the Egyptian Ministry of Military Production that used to play their home matches there, would be allowed to play at the stadium normally until the end of the 2019–20 season to avoid any possible problems or conflicts in the league's schedule, with the option to extend it for further seasons. Al Ahly also confirmed that all national teams would be allowed to play on the venue.

2019 Africa Cup of Nations
The stadium was one of the venues for the 2019 Africa Cup of Nations.

The following games were played at the stadium during the 2019 Africa Cup of Nations:

Gallery

References

External links

Photos at worldstadiums.com
Photos of Stadiums in Egypt at cafe.daum.net/stade

2009 establishments in Egypt
Football venues in Egypt
Stadiums in Cairo
Egypt
Sports venues completed in 2009
Football in Cairo
2019 Africa Cup of Nations stadiums
21st-century architecture in Egypt